The 2014–15 UMass Lowell River Hawks women's basketball team will represent the University of Massachusetts Lowell in the America East Conference.  The River Hawks are led by first year head coach Jenerrie Harris  and will once again play most their home games in the Costello Athletic Center while select games will be played in the Tsongas Center at UMass Lowell. As part of their transition to Division I, they are ineligible for post season play until the 2017–18 season. They finished the season 14–15, 7–9 in America East play for a sixth-place finish.

Media
All non-televised home games and conference road games will stream on either ESPN3 or AmericaEast.tv. Most road games will stream on the opponents website.

Roster

Schedule

|-
!colspan=12 style="background:#333399; color:#CC3333;"| Regular season

See also
2014–15 UMass Lowell River Hawks men's basketball team
UMass Lowell River Hawks women's basketball

References

UMass Lowell River Hawks women's basketball seasons
UMass Lowell
UMass
UMass